Saundby is a village in Nottinghamshire, England two miles west of Gainsborough and lay within the civil parish of Beckingham cum Saundby. In 2011 it had become a civil parish in its own name. The parish is bordered on one side by the River Trent. The village Church of St Martin was extensively restored in 1885.

Saundby Origin – Saun+by (+by – farmstead of) Danish origin, possibly when the Danes travelled inland up the River Idle and settled in the area). Saundby is a small hamlet adjoining Beckingham with a population of approximately 100. Saundby was a village of farmstead and small holdings. At one point a cheese farm existed as a way of dealing with excess milk that arose when the school canteens were closed.

Population
The very small population of around 100 people in Saundby has had little or no change in the last 50 years. The population was measured at 165 at the 2011 census.

History
A worker with Eve Transmission, 33 year old Jeremy Dunn, fell to his death from an electrical 400kV transmission tower on Tuesday 22 June 1993, north of West Burton power station. The electrical transmission line lies to the east of the village.

References

Villages in Nottinghamshire
Bassetlaw District